Ana Paula Galbiatti Campos (born 2 September 1994) is a Brazilian female badminton player. Teamed-up with Fabiana Silva, she won the women's doubles title in 2014 Puerto Rico and 2015 Colombia. She also won the mixed doubles title at the Suriname International tournament partnered with Jonathan Persson of Germany.

Achievements

BWF International Challenge/Series
Women's Doubles

Mixed Doubles

 BWF International Challenge tournament
 BWF International Series tournament
 BWF Future Series tournament

References

External links 
 

Living people
1994 births
Sportspeople from Campinas
Brazilian female badminton players
21st-century Brazilian women